William Penn Haisley (December 22, 1831 – 1906) was Florida's school superintendent. He served as principal of the South Florida Male and Female Institute in Tampa which transitioned quickly into a free school.

He was born into a Quaker family in Wayne County, Indiana and named for the Quaker founder of Pennsylvania. He studied at McKendree College in Lebanon, Illinois. He graduated from Harvard Law School in 1861.

He served as Florida's superintendent of schools from 1877 until 1881. He was succeeded by Eleazer Foster.

See also
Florida Department of Education

References

People from Wayne County, Indiana
1831 births
1906 deaths
Harvard Law School alumni
American Quakers
School superintendents in Florida
McKendree University alumni